QFD may refer to:
Quality function deployment
Quantum flavordynamics
Question-focused dataset
Boufarik Airport, Algeria 
 Qufu East railway station, China Railway pinyin code QFD